Peter Howard (born Howard Weiss; July 29, 1927, in Miami, Florida – April 18, 2008, in Englewood, New Jersey) was an American musical theater arranger, conductor and pianist. Coming to prominence in the 1960s, he was the conductor and dance music arranger for the original Broadway productions of Hello, Dolly!, 1776 and Annie and was the dance music arranger for the original Broadway productions of Chicago, The Tap Dance Kid and Crazy for You.

References

External links
 
 

1927 births
2008 deaths
20th-century American pianists
American male pianists
20th-century American male musicians